Neponset (Martin Station until 1900) is an unincorporated community in Monterey County, California.

History

Neponset was once a Southern Pacific Railroad station south of the Salinas River along the Monterey Branch Line. The station was near Castroville, the self-proclaimed "Artichoke Capital of the World," It was on the boundary of Rancho Rincón de las Salinas at the corner of the marshland. Neponset is primarily undeveloped and used as agricultural land. A branch line can be seen at Neponset along the abandoned Monterey Branch line. Dole Fresh Vegetables of Dole Food Company occupies the site next to the station.

In 1879, when the Southern Pacific Railroad purchased the Monterey & Salinas Valley Railroad, it built a new route between Castroville, California and Bardin. Two bridges crossover the Salinas River. The railroad put in place a station just south of the bridges called "Martin's Station". Passenger and freight service went through the station.  

Pioneer John Martin came to California with his family during the California Gold Rush. When they landed in Monterey by ship in 1856, they acquired a ranch at Neponset where the family became farmers. John's brother, Robert H. Martin, lived in Neponset. In 1879, John's father, William Martin, returned to Neponset and lived with John's sister, Mary, and John Jefferson, who had a large family. By 1880, the Jeffersons had eight children. The Martin Ranch was sold on August 23, 1929, to millionaire tycoon Willis J. and Alma Walker of Pebble Beach. James, William, and Roy Martin of Carmel Valley, Robert Martin of Neponset, Carmel Martin of Monterey, and Isabel Martin of Carmel, were all born on the Martin Ranch.

In 1890, Martin's Station had a school house and several ranches.  

Martin's station was renamed in 1900 to "Neponset", after Neponset, Boston, Massachusetts, where the Neponset Indians were the original inhabitants. Neponset was an Indigenous word meaning "little summer place". In the early 1900s, several announcements of families living in Neponset were listed in The Californian newspaper. The Neponset Temperance Club was started by men of Neponset. William H. Martin was president and James A. Martin was treasurer. The club was formed for the promotion of sociability and the cause of temperance.

The population of Neponset reached its peak in the 1920s when a water tower was built. In the 1930s, the town began to shrink, and passenger service stopped during World War II. The Neponset station was taken out from train schedules by 1960.

Railroad information

The station had a 14 car track, a water tank that was installed in the 1920s, a class-A rail yard with a platform on the south side of the tracks that supported freight and passenger service. By 1951, the station no longer supported passenger service and its track shrank to only a 9 car track. On March 18, 1962, the Southern Pacific SD7 no. 5331, went westbound at Neponset, California, crossed the Salinas River to Monterey. By 1963, the station was taken out of Southern Pacific timetables.

Monte Road is a frontage road that runs beside State Route 1, south of the Salinas River crossing. The railroad tracks still exist outside the Dole Food Company plant. The tracks break off just at the staff parking lot. Neponset Road wraps around the plant on its southern edge.

See also
Coastal California
List of school districts in Monterey County, California
List of tourist attractions in Monterey County, California

References

External links
 
 Neponset, California

Unincorporated communities in California
Incorporated cities and towns in California
Unincorporated communities in Monterey County, California